The Skittle bomb, also known in France as "rétreau" (pronounced "rétro"), is an alcoholic bomb shot cocktail that gets its name from its Skittles confectionery taste.  The method of preparation is similar to that of the Jägerbomb. It consists of a shot glass of Cointreau, an orange liqueur dropped into a glass containing energy drink (usually Red Bull).

In south-east Asia (mainly Singapore) the Skittle bomb is also known as C-bomb, where the C stands for Cointreau.

A Skittle bomb is typically served with a can or a half-can of Red Bull, or another similar style energy drink poured into a pot glass and separately accompanied by Cointreau (an orange liqueur) in a shot glass. The shot glass of Cointreau is then dropped into the energy drink.

This is different to "skittles vodka" which was invented by Danielle K Gibson.

See also 

Bomb shot
Caffeinated alcohol drinks ban
List of liqueurs
Jägerbomb
Shooter (mixed drink)

References

Cocktails with triple sec or curaçao
Caffeinated alcoholic drinks